Phifer is a surname. Notable people with the surname include: 

James Reese Phifer (1916–1998), American businessman and philanthropist
Mekhi Phifer (born 1974), American actor
Roman Phifer (born 1968), American football player
Thomas Phifer (born 1953), American architect